The 1979 Louisiana gubernatorial election resulted in the election of David Treen as the first Republican governor of Louisiana since Reconstruction. Incumbent Governor Edwin Edwards was ineligible to run for a third term.

This was the first gubernatorial election held after the adoption of the Louisiana primary in 1978.

Background 
Elections in Louisiana—with the exception of U.S. presidential elections—follow a variation of the open primary system called the jungle primary or the nonpartisan blanket primary. Candidates of any and all parties are listed on one ballot; voters need not limit themselves to the candidates of one party. Unless one candidate takes more than 50% of the vote in the first round, a run-off election is then held between the top two candidates, who may in fact be members of the same party. Texas uses this same format for its special elections. In this election, the first round of voting was held on  October 27, 1979.  The runoff was held on December 8, 1979.

Results  
First voting round, October 27

Runoff, December 8

References

Sources 
State of Louisiana.  Primary and General Election Returns, 1979.

1979
Gubernatorial
Louisiana
Louisiana gubernatorial election
Louisiana gubernatorial election